Events from the year 1605 in Ireland.

Incumbent
Monarch: James I

Events
February 3 – Sir Arthur Chichester is appointed Lord Deputy of Ireland, an office he will hold for a decade.
March 11 – a proclamation declares all people of Ireland to be the direct subjects of the British Crown and not of any local lord or chief.
July 4 – a proclamation commands all Roman Catholic seminary priests and Jesuits to leave the country by 10 December and directs the laity to attend Church of Ireland services.
October 14 – Thomas Jones is appointed to succeed Adam Loftus as Lord Chancellor of Ireland.
November 8 – Thomas Jones is appointed to succeed Adam Loftus as Archbishop of Dublin (Church of Ireland).
November – Scottish adventurer James Hamilton is granted the lordship of Upper (South) Clandeboye and the Great Ardes in the north of County Down by King James VI and I.
The Irish College in Paris is co-founded by John Lee, an Irish priest, and John de l'Escalopier, President of the Parlement.
Refugee French Huguenot merchants begin to settle in Dublin and Waterford.

Births
Raymond Caron, Franciscan friar and author (d. 1666)
Lady Hester Pulter, born Hester Ley, poet (d. 1678 in England)
Approximate date – James Dillon, 3rd Earl of Roscommon (d. 1649)

Deaths
April 5 – Adam Loftus, Archbishop of Dublin (Church of Ireland) and Lord Chancellor of Ireland (b. c.1533)
September 24 – Sir George Bourchier, soldier and politician (b. 1535)
 Tadhg O'Rourke, King of West Breifne

References

 
1600s in Ireland
Ireland
Years of the 17th century in Ireland